Piedades Norte is a district of the San Ramón canton, in the Alajuela province of Costa Rica.

Geography 
Piedades Norte has an area of  km² and an elevation of  metres.

Demographics 

For the 2011 census, Piedades Norte had a population of  inhabitants.

Transportation

Road transportation 
The district is covered by the following road routes:
 National Route 702
 National Route 705
 National Route 742

References 

Districts of Alajuela Province
Populated places in Alajuela Province